Sampheng is a historic neighbourhood and market in Bangkok's Chinatown, in Samphanthawong District. It was settled during the establishment of Bangkok in 1782 by Teochew Chinese, and eventually grew into the surrounding areas. The original street of Sampheng, now officially known as Soi Wanit 1, is now a small alleyway lined with numerous shops, and is a famous market.

History & toponymy
Sampheng, in fact, is the name of a khlong (canal) that used to current through this area in the past. It connects Khlong Maha Nak and Chao Phraya River (now being filled in since King Rama VII's reign to build many roads in the area well-known as Khlong Thom presently).

Sampheng is in historical account of King Rama I, saying that the King found a land on the eastern bank of Chao Phraya River occupied by Teochew Chinese community is the most suitable place to build the Royal Grand Palace. On King's request, the community moved to area near Khlong Sampheng, and the area was later also called Sampheng.

Formerly, people lived in Sampheng were mostly running business of imported goods from abroad and built warehouses nearby, the area became very dense. During King Rama V's reign, the area was on great fired three times, each time after fired, the King ordered to construct the road on the damaged areas. The first was Sampheng Road, bridged Ratchawong Road and Trok Rong Krata (today's Yaowapanit Road). The second was made straightly to connect the bridge across the canal at Wat Pathum Khongkha and Yaowarat Road. The third linked Ratchawong and Chakkrawat Roads near Saphan Han and Phahurat quarters. The width of the road is 5 wa (10 meters).

Even though Sampheng is now officially known as Wanit 1 Road or Soi Wanit 1, people in general are more commonly referred to and known as Sampheng. It is a small alleyway lined with numerous shops, and is now Bangkok's premier wholesale market.

Its name  "Sampheng"  is not clear what it means or where come from. There are many speculations that it may be distorted from the word "Samphraeng" (สามแพร่ง) which means "three-way junction" or some believe that they come from Teochew language or even distorted from the name of a species of edible fern "Lampheng" (ลำเพ็ง; Stenochlaena palustris) that used to abound here in the past. However, according to Chit Phumisak, a historian, Sampheng is probably the Mon language which means "noble" and it may be that this place was inhabited by the Mon before Chinese. 

Mid-2019 news reports said that Sampheng's business was at its lowest level in 50 years. One trader said that business was down 70% from previous years, driving some shops to close. A similar downturn has afflicted other Bangkok markets like Pratunam and Bobae. Some have attributed the slowdown to weak domestic demand and the strength of the baht, but business volumes began to slump three to four years ago according to shop owners, well before the economy stalled and the baht appreciated. One economist, writing in the Bangkok Post, blames the rise of internet commerce for the decline.

Operating hours 
Sampheng is usually open 24/7, divided into two periods, day and night. During the day it is open from 08:00 to 17:00. At night, most shops are open from 23:00 but most customers come between 01:00 and 06:00.

Merchandise 
 Market stalls sell gift items, toys, stationery, clothing, footwear, fabrics, foodstuffs, and innumerable other items.

See also
Saphan Han
Soi Lalai Sap
Song Wat
Tha Din Daeng

References 

Shopping districts and streets in Bangkok
Neighbourhoods of Bangkok
Chinese-Thai culture
Samphanthawong district